Nieuwe Meer is a hamlet in the Dutch province of North Holland. It is a part of the municipality of Haarlemmermeer, and lies about 8 km southwest of Amsterdam.

Nieuwe Meer has a population of around 410.

Nieuwe Meer is originally the name of the adjacent small lake which lies within Amsterdam city borders.

References

Populated places in North Holland
Haarlemmermeer